Mammillaria gasseriana is a species of plant in the family Cactaceae. It is endemic to Mexico.  Its natural habitat is hot deserts.

References

gasseriana
Cacti of Mexico
Endemic flora of Mexico
Vulnerable plants
Taxonomy articles created by Polbot